The following is a list of events affecting Canadian television in 1958. Events listed include television show debuts, finales, cancellations, and channel launches.

Notable events

The Board of Broadcast Governors (BBG) was established to be the “watchdog” of Canadian broadcasting under the new Broadcasting Act of 1958. The formation of the BBG, prompted by public demand for alternative programming choices, led to the establishment of “second” television stations in eight cities across the country.
The CBC's first live coast-to-coast live television broadcast was aired after the cross-country microwave network was completed thanks to the cooperation with Bell Media, opening  worth of microwave links carrying television signals, teletype messages, and telephone calls.

Births 
January 10 – Terrence Scammell, voice actor and voice director

Television shows

Debuts 
Canadian Bandstand (1958–19??, CKCO-TV)
March 30 - The Friendly Giant (1958-1985, CBC) 
Wayne and Shuster Show (1958–1989, CBC)

Programs on-air this year
Country Canada (1954-2007)
CBC News Magazine (1952-1981) 
The National (1954–present) 
The C.G.E. Show (1952-1959) 
Circle 8 Ranch (1955-1978)
The Friendly Giant (1958-1985) 
Front Page Challenge (1957-1995)
Hockey Night in Canada (1952–present)
Maggie Muggins (1955–1962)
Open House (1952-1962)
Wayne and Shuster Show (1958-1989)

Television stations

Debuts

See also
1958 in Canada 
1958 in television

References

External links
CBC Directory of Television Series at Queen’s University (Archived March 4, 2016)